Diego Gobbi (born 8 June 1995 in São Paulo) is a Brazilian professional squash player. As of December 2021, he was ranked number 204 in the world.

References

1995 births
Living people
Brazilian male squash players
Sportspeople from São Paulo
21st-century Brazilian people